Khoma is a progressive and alternative metal musical group from Sweden (Umeå). Some of its members also play with Cult of Luna, The Perishers and The Deportees. Founded by Jan Jämte (vocals), Johannes Persson (guitar) and Fredrik Kihlberg (vocals, piano), the first EP was released in 2002, leading to the album Tsunami in 2004.

Discography 

 Tsunami (2004)
 The Second Wave (2006)
 A Final Storm (2010)
 All Erodes (2012)

External links 

 

Swedish alternative metal musical groups
Musical groups established in 2002
Swedish progressive metal musical groups
2002 establishments in Sweden